The 2001 Dutch TT was the seventh round of the 2001 Grand Prix motorcycle racing season. It took place on the weekend of 28–30 June 2001 at the TT Circuit Assen.

500 cc classification
The race was stopped after 15 of the 20 scheduled laps due to rain.

250 cc classification

125 cc classification

Championship standings after the race (500cc)
Below are the standings for the top five riders and constructors after round seven has concluded.

Riders' Championship standings

Constructors' Championship standings

 Note: Only the top five positions are included for both sets of standings.

References

Dutch TT
Dutch
Tourist Trophy